Magyar Nemzet is a major Hungarian newspaper published in Hungary, and in 2021 styled itself as "close to the current Hungarian government led by Viktor Orbán."

History and profile
Magyar Nemzet, a moderate conservative daily, was founded by Sándor Pethő in 1938. The paper fused with the other conservative daily Napi Magyarország in April 2000.

Magyar Nemzet is regarded as part of conservative media which intensified in the country in 2010. Its editorials often speak out against the socialist and liberal parties, Hungarian Socialist Party (MSZP) and Alliance of Free Democrats (SZDSZ).

Magyar Nemzet is published in broadsheet format. Its major rival was Népszabadság, the former communist party newspaper, mostly supported the former socialist MSZP/SZDSZ government. Magyar Nemzet'''s editorials often complain about bias of the more readily available Népszabadság and the former MSZP government's de facto censorship by cutting off funds for conservative newspaper.

Circulation
The circulation of Magyar Nemzet was 132,000 copies in January 1989 and 121,000 copies in January 1991. The paper had a circulation of 70,000 copies in July 1992 and 55,000 copies in March 1993. Its circulation was 41,000 copies in 1998. The paper had a circulation of 64,209 copies in 2009, making it the fifth best-selling daily in the country. However, the paper lost one-third of its readers between 2005 and 2010. During the same period the visitors of its website also declined.

 Closure 
In April 2018 the publisher released a statement saying that the last edition of Magyar Nemzet will be released on 11 April 2018 citing financial problems. The online presence MNO.Hu did not function from April 2018 to February 2019.

 Relaunch 
On 6 February 2019 Magyar Nemzet was relaunched as new version of Magyar Idők''.

References

External links

ICON: International Newspaper Database

1938 establishments in Hungary
2019 establishments in Hungary
Daily newspapers published in Hungary
Fidesz
Hungarian-language newspapers
Publications established in 2019
Newspapers established in 1938
Conservatism in Hungary
Defunct newspapers published in Hungary
Newspapers published in Budapest